Franck Meyrignac (born 27 September 1970) is a French former football defender.

References

Living people
1970 births
Association football defenders
French footballers
US Orléans players
FC Metz players
Ligue 1 players